Grand-pères, grand-pères au sirop d'érable or grand-pères dans le sirop d'érable is a traditional pastry in Québécois and Acadian cuisine. The term pépère is also used to describe this dish in some regions of Quebec like Beauce. This pastry is commonly served during "le temps des sucres" in sugar shacks.

Description 
Grand-pères are cakes which are more or less in the shape of a ball and that created out of dough made from flour, baking powder, butter, milk and sugar. Grand-pères must be put in boiling maple syrup so that they are infused with its flavour. They are served with the boiled maple syrup and often with ice cream. Brown sugar can sometimes replace the maple syrup and vanilla can sometimes be added.

Variants 
This dessert has several variations, such as grand-pères stuffed with apples, raspberries, strawberries, blueberries, pecans or even caramel. The maple syrup can also be replaced with brown sugar.

Origin 
This dessert is said to be of Acadian origin and that its current name dates back from when it arrived in Quebec.  The name "grand-père" is assumed to have been given to this dish either because grandfathers could easily eat this dish despite having lost their teeth, because the ball resembled an elderly face or because the dish was prepared by grandfathers who were relegated the easy task of stirring maple syrup in the cauldron.

References and notes

See also
 Cuisine of Quebec
 Acadian cuisine
 Maple syrup
 Sugar shack

External links
Recette de Grands-pères au sirop d'érable
Différentes recettes de Grands-pères 

Cuisine of Quebec
Acadian cuisine
Pastries